Curtis Parker (1901 – April 19, 1982) was an American football and basketball player and coach. He served as the head football coach at Centenary College of Louisiana in Shreveport, Louisiana from 1934 to 1939, compiling a record of 37–27–6. He was also the head basketball coach at Centenary 
from 1927 to 1939, tallying a mark of 37–27–6.

Parker was born in 1901 in Wilmar, Arkansas and was raised in Oklahoma. He died on April 19, 1982, at Virginia Hall Nursing Home in Shreveport.

Head coaching record

Football

References

1901 births
1982 deaths
American football ends
Guards (basketball)
Arkansas Razorbacks football players
Arkansas Razorbacks men's basketball players
Centenary Gentlemen and Ladies athletic directors
Centenary Gentlemen football coaches
Centenary Gentlemen basketball coaches
People from Drew County, Arkansas
Basketball coaches from Oklahoma
Basketball players from Oklahoma
Coaches of American football from Arkansas
Players of American football from Arkansas